During the 1991–92 English football season, Norwich City F.C. competed in the Football League First Division.

Season summary
In the 1991–92 season, Norwich's form for most of the season was satisfying which saw them by 21 March sitting in 13th, but afterwards things started to go downhill with a poor run which saw the Canaries lose 7 of their final 8 league games, collecting only one point which saw Norwich finish in a disappointing 18th place and one day before final game of the season, Dave Stringer handed in his resignation. Their cup form that season though was excellent where they reached the FA Cup semi finals where they ended up losing 1–0 to Sunderland, and also reached the League Cup quarter finals where they lost 2–1 at Tottenham Hotspur.

Final league table

Results
Norwich City's score comes first

Legend

Football League First Division

FA Cup

League Cup

Full Members Cup

Squad

Transfers

In

Out

Transfers in:  £1,525,000
Transfers out:  £1,700,000
Total spending:  £175,000

References

Norwich City F.C. seasons
Norwich City